Gerd Poshteh (also known as Gerdeh Poshteh, Gerdū Poshteh, and Sargerdū Poshteh) is a village in Blukat Rural District, Rahmatabad and Blukat District, Rudbar County, Gilan Province, Iran. At the 2006 census, its population was 109, in 26 families.

References 

Populated places in Rudbar County